The Deep Sea Mining Act 2014 is an act of the Parliament of the United Kingdom. It received Royal Assent on 14 May 2014. It is unusual as this bill passed through parliament as a private members bill, it was sponsored by Sheryll Murray MP and Baroness Wilcox.
The Act enables the deep sea mining sector to be regulated in a modern way and aims to prevent damage to the environment.

References

United Kingdom Acts of Parliament 2014